opened in the grounds of Matsuyama Castle in Matsuyama, Ehime Prefecture, Japan in 1998, as the successor to the , which opened in 1970.

See also

 Museum of Ehime History and Culture
 List of Cultural Properties of Japan - paintings (Ehime)

References

External links
  The Museum of Art, Ehime

Museums in Ehime Prefecture
Matsuyama, Ehime
Art museums established in 1970
1970 establishments in Japan
Art museums and galleries in Japan
Prefectural museums